Kim Dong-Ki  (born 27 May 1989) is a South Korean footballer who plays as a striker.

External links 

1989 births
Living people
Association football forwards
South Korean footballers
Gangwon FC players
FC Anyang players
Pohang Steelers players
Seongnam FC players
K League 1 players
K League 2 players